Cyperus digitatus, also known as finger flatsedge in the United States, and chang xiao sui suo cao in China, is a sedge of the family Cyperaceae that is native to tropical and subtropical areas of Africa, Asia, the Americas and Australia.

Description
The leaves below are nearly the same length as the culms and have brown to purple coloured sheaths.

Taxonomy
The species was first described by the botanist William Roxburgh in 1820 as a part of the work Flora Indica; or descriptions of Indian Plants. The type specimen was collected by Roxburgh in India. It has ten synonyms including; Cyperus bourgaei, Cyperus digitatus var. laxiflorus, Cyperus digitatus var. pingbienensis and Cyperus mexicanus.

Distribution
In Asia the renge of the plant extends from Pakistan in the west to the eastern sea board of China in the east and extends doen through most of Malesia. In Australia is found in creek beds and other damp areas in a small area in the Kimberley region of Western Australia as well as other northern tropical parts of the Northern Territory and Queensland. In the Americas it is found as far north as Texas with the rnge exteding south through Central America and into South America as far south as Argentina. In Africa it is found as far north as Egypt south through the rest of the continent to Botswana.

See also
List of Cyperus species

References

digitatus
Plants described in 1820
Taxa named by William Roxburgh
Flora of Western Australia
Flora of the Northern Territory
Flora of Queensland
Flora of Angola
Flora of Argentina
Flora of Assam (region)
Flora of Bangladesh
Flora of Belize
Flora of Bolivia
Flora of Botswana
Flora of Borneo
Flora of Brazil
Flora of Burkina Faso
Flora of Burundi
Flora of Cameroon
Flora of Chad
Flora of the Central African Republic
Flora of China
Flora of Colombia
Flora of Costa Rica
Flora of Cuba
Flora of the Dominican Republic
Flora of Ecuador
Flora of Egypt
Flora of Ethiopia
Flora of Florida
Flora of Gabon
Flora of the Gambia
Flora of Ghana
Flora of Guatemala
Flora of Guinea
Flora of Guyana
Flora of Hainan
Flora of Haiti
Flora of India
Flora of Ivory Coast
Flora of Jamaica
Flora of Java
Flora of Kenya
Flora of Laos
Flora of Malawi
Flora of Malaysia
Flora of Mali
Flora of Mozambique
Flora of Mauritania
Flora of Mexico
Flora of Myanmar
Flora of Namibia
Flora of Nepal
Flora of New Guinea
Flora of Niger
Flora of Nigeria
Flora of Pakistan
Flora of Panama
Flora of Paraguay
Flora of Peru
Flora of the Philippines
Flora of Puerto Rico
Flora of Senegal
Flora of Rwanda
Flora of Sri Lanka
Flora of Sudan
Flora of Sulawesi
Flora of Sumatra
Flora of Suriname
Flora of Taiwan
Flora of Tanzania
Flora of Texas
Flora of Thailand
Flora of Tibet
Flora of Uganda
Flora of Venezuela
Flora of Vietnam
Flora of Zambia
Flora of Zimbabwe
Flora of the Democratic Republic of the Congo